Speculative poetry is a genre of poetry that focusses on fantastic, science fictional and mythological themes. It is also known as science fiction poetry or fantastic poetry. It is distinguished from other poetic genres by being categorized by its subject matter, rather than by the poetry's form. Suzette Haden Elgin defined the genre as "about a reality that is in some way different from the existing reality."

Due to the similarity of subject matter, it is often published by the same markets that publish short stories and novellas of science fiction, fantasy and horror, and many authors write both in speculative fiction and speculative poetry. The field has one major award, the Rhysling Award, given annually to a poem of more than fifty lines and to a sub-fifty lines poem by the US-based Science Fiction Poetry Association.

History
Much of the Romantic poetry of the 19th century used techniques seen in modern fantasy literature: retellings of classical mythology and European folklore, both to show alternative angles in the stories and to explore social issues.  Many distinguished poets here were women, and many used folktales as an acceptable social camouflage with which to explore feminist concerns. One of the most celebrated of these poems, Christina Rossetti's 1862 "Goblin Market", remains a source of critical debate.

Andrew Joron wrote in 1981, that over the past decade in the United States "it was possible to create a tradition, that established and defined the genre" of science fiction poetry.

In common with the gradual recognition of science fiction and fantasy as distinct literary genres in the 1930s, science-fictional poetry began publication as a distinct genre in the pulp magazines of the United States. Fantasy-specific Weird Tales (1923–1954) and its brief compatriot Unknown (1939–43) were the only major publishers. They were succeeded by more serious venues including the US-based The Magazine of Fantasy & Science Fiction (F&SF) (1949–), the UK-based flagship of the New Wave movement New Worlds while it was under the editorship of Michael Moorcock between 1964 and 1970, and the annual reprint anthologies of F&SF and The Year's Best Science Fiction edited by Judith Merril. These anthologies drew much of their content from mainstream or literary sources.

In the 1960s, anthologies of original speculative material began to be published. F&SF ceased accepting poetry in 1977, a gap in the market taken up by the newly established Asimov's. The Science Fiction Poetry Association (SFPA) was founded by Suzette Haden Elgin the following year. In the 1970s, Elgin's colleague Frederick J. Mayer for some time awarded an annual Clark Ashton Smith Award for best fantastic poetry.

By 1990, Asimov's remained the major news-stand market, but a diverse array of predominantly US-based small press markets had developed, many lasting several decades, and many choosing purely electronic publication post-2000. This is in common with mainstream written poetry in the US over this time.

SFPA (now called the Science Fiction and Fantasy Poetry Association) awards the Rhysling for short- and long-form SF and fantasy poetry awards annually; most winners have been either science fiction or science-themed rather than fantasy or horror. Most Rhysling nominees have been from the small-press poetry journals Dreams & Nightmares, The Magazine of Speculative Poetry, and the SFPA's own journal, Star*Line. Winners are reprinted in the Nebula Awards anthology.
The Horror Writers Association has a separate recognition for single-author collections of horror poetry, the Bram Stoker Award, though there is no facility in the Bram Stoker Award to honour anthologies of horror/weird poetry.

Subgenres and themes

Science fiction
Science fiction poetry's main sources are the sciences and the literary movement of science fiction prose.

Scientifically-informed verse, sometimes termed poetry of science, is a branch that has either scientists and their work or scientific phenomena as its primary focus; it may also use scientific jargon as metaphor. Important collections in this area include the 1985 anthology of predominantly Science-published poems Songs from Distant Worlds. This area often sees work by mainstream poets, and works on these themes dominated the early years of the Rhysling awards.

Mythic
Mythic poetry deals with myth and folklore, with a particular focus on reinterpreting and retelling traditional stories.

Horror
Horror poetry is a subset which, in the same way as horror fiction, concentrates on ghostly, macabre, spectral, supernatural themes.  Modern horror poetry may also introduce themes of sadism, violence, gore, and the like.

Weird
Weird poetry is a subset. It differs in several important ways from straightforward modern horror poetry.  It arises from the early 20th century literary tradition of 'the weird' also known as weird fiction, in which certain groups of authors collectively attempted to move beyond tired old stories of haunted castles, graveyard ghosts, and suave vampires.  It tends to be concerned with the subtly uncanny, and is expressed in macabre and serious tones. The atmospheres of a certain place may be evoked, and the narrator may discover certain weird details of that place which arouse a sense of unexplainable dread. Some weird poetry will describe timeless geological forces or the night sky, trying to harness the feeling of dread to a wider and sublime 'cosmic awe' about mankind's insignificance in the universe. Yet the narrators of such poetry tend to be unreliable, and may perhaps be on the edge of madness. They may describe or hint at unreal nature-defying events which occur in otherwise normal places - although without the overt technical explanation found in science fiction, and without the violence and sadism common to modern post-1970 horror.  S. T. Joshi's short book of essays Emperors of Dreams: Some Notes on Weird Poetry (2008) examines a number of key weird poets. While weird poetry has appeared in a vast array of anthologies and journals (both professional and small-press), perhaps the first journal devoted exclusively to this form is Spectral Realms, founded in 2013 by editor S.T. Joshi and published by Hippocampus Press.

Noted poets

See also

 New Weird
 Scifaiku
 Slipstream (genre)
 Speculative art

References
Notes

Citations

Bibliography

Further reading
 The Year's Best Science Fiction, edited by Harry Harrison and Brian Aldiss, a nine volume anthology series which included a poetry section in every volume.
August Derleth ed. Dark of the Moon: Poems of Fantasy and the Macabre. Sauk City, WI: Arkham House, 1947. Crucial anthology of 65 poets ranging from border balladeers to moderns.
 August Derleth ed. Fire and Sleet and Candlelight: New Poems of the Macabre. Sauk City, WI: Arkham House, 1961. Anthology of 93 poets, mainly moderns.
 Elgin, Suzette Haden, The Science Fiction Poetry Handbook, 2005. Sam's Dot Publishing  
 Frazier, Robert, ed. Burning with a Vision: Poetry of Science and the Fantastic. Philadelphia: Owlswick press, 1984. Fantastic poetry by moderns from Diane Ackerman to Al Zolynas.
 Lovecraft, Charles. "Echoes in the Wilderness: Weird Poetry in Australia". Futurian Observer No 1 (new series) (April 2010), pp. 15–16. Pioneering checklist of weird and fantastic poems by Australian writers.
 Scott E. Green. Contemporary Science Fiction, Fantasy and Horror Poetry: A Resource Guide and Biographical Directory (Greenwood Press, 1989)  
 S.T. Joshi and Steven J. Mariconda, eds. Dreams of fear: Poetry of Terror and the Supernatural. Comprehensive anthology of weird poetry from Homer through to moderns such as Gary William Crawford, Ann K. Schwader, Bruce Boston, G. Sutton Brieding, W.H. Pugmire and Leigh Blackmore.
 S.T. Joshi Emperors of Dreams: Some Notes on Weird Poetry. P'rea Press, 2008.

External links
Speculative Poetry: A Symposium, Part 1 of 2 (Strange Horizons)
Speculative Poetry: A Symposium, Part 2 of 2 (Strange Horizons)
The Failure of Genre Poetry by Bruce Boston at the Fortean Bureau
Dialogues by Starlight: Three Approaches to Writing SF Poetry by Michael Collings

Online venues
Abyss & Apex
Eye To The Telescope
Goblin Fruit
Ideomancer
inkscrawl
Journal of Mythic Arts
Niteblade
Mithila Review
Mythic Delirium
Star*Line
Stone Telling
Strange Horizons
Through the Gate

Genres of poetry
Science fiction genres
Fantasy genres